Ghazaros is an Armenian given name. Notable people with the name include:

 Ghazaros Saryan, Armenian composer and educator
 Ghazaros Aghayan, Armenian writer, educator, folklorist, historian, linguist and public figure
 Ghazaros Aghajanian, Armenian Cardinal of the Catholic Church

See also
 Ghazar

Armenian masculine given names